The 1974 Kentucky Wildcats football team represented the University of Kentucky in the Southeastern Conference (SEC) during the 1974 NCAA Division I football season. The Wildcats scored 248 points while allowing 194 points, finishing 6–5 overall and 3–3 in the SEC.

Season
Mike Fanuzzi and Tom Ehlers were chosen as team captains.

Kentucky opened with a 38–7 win at Virginia Tech, followed by a 16–3 road loss at West Virginia.  A 28-22 home win against Indiana was next, then a 14–10 loss to Miami (Ohio).

Kentucky lost its SEC opener on the road at Auburn, 31–13, but followed with a 20–13 home win against LSU, the Wildcats' first victory vs. the Bayou Bengals since 1960.  A 24-20 home loss to Georgia was followed by a 30–7 win at Tulane.  Kentucky then won two conference games at home, 38–12 against Vanderbilt and 41–24 against #9-ranked Florida (7–2).  Florida already received an invitation to the Sugar Bowl, while Kentucky, at 5–4, was looking to clinch its first winning season since 1965.  Florida jumped out to a 17–6 lead but Kentucky outscored the Gators 35–7 the rest of the way, causing three Florida fumbles, intercepting two passes and blocking two punts.  Kentucky closed its season with a 24–7 loss at Tennessee for a final mark of 6–5 overall and 3–3 in the SEC.

Schedule

Roster
RB Sonny Collins, Jr.

Team players in the 1975 NFL Draft

References

Kentucky
Kentucky Wildcats football seasons
Kentucky Wildcats football